Bridgeport Township is an inactive township in Warren County, in the U.S. state of Missouri.

Bridgeport Township was erected in 1833, taking its name from the community of Bridgeport, Missouri.

References

Townships in Missouri
Townships in Warren County, Missouri